George Banks (born October 9, 1972) is an American former professional basketball player who was selected in the 1995 NBA draft by the Miami Heat.

References

1972 births
Living people
Alba Fehérvár players
American expatriate basketball people in Australia
American expatriate basketball people in Cyprus
American expatriate basketball people in Hungary
American expatriate basketball people in Israel
American expatriate basketball people in Italy
American expatriate basketball people in the Philippines
American expatriate basketball people in Turkey
American expatriate basketball people in Venezuela
American men's basketball players
APOEL B.C. players
Bandırma B.İ.K. players
Basketball coaches from Arizona
Basketball players from Arizona
BC Körmend players
Canberra Cannons players
Central Arizona Vaqueros men's basketball players
Cocodrilos de Caracas players
Dinamo Sassari players
Forwards (basketball)
High school basketball coaches in California
Ironi Ramat Gan players
Keravnos B.C. players
Miami Heat draft picks
New Mexico Slam players
People from Marana, Arizona
Perth Wildcats players
Philippine Basketball Association imports
Rockford Lightning players
Sportspeople from the Phoenix metropolitan area
Shreveport Storm players
UTEP Miners men's basketball players
Shell Turbo Chargers players